John Foster, 1st Baron Oriel PC (Ire) (1740 – 23 August 1828) was an Anglo-Irish peer and politician, who served as Chancellor of the Exchequer of Ireland (1784–1785, 1804–1806, 1807–1811) and as the last Speaker of the Irish House of Commons (1785–1800).

Early life
He was the son of Anthony Foster of  Dunleer, Louth, Chief Baron of the Irish Exchequer (himself the son of John Foster, MP for Dunleer) by his first wife Elizabeth Burgh. Foster lived in Merville, now part of the University College Dublin Campus in Clonskeagh, which came into his ownership in 1778. He also inherited Collon House in County Louth from his father, and made extensive improvements to the house and grounds; Collon was famous for its variety of trees and shrubs.

Political career
He was elected Member of Parliament (MP) to the Irish House of Commons for Dunleer in 1761, a seat he held until 1769. He made his mark in financial and commercial questions, being appointed Irish Chancellor of the Exchequer in 1784. His law giving bounties on the exportation of corn and imposing heavy taxes on its importation is noted by William Lecky as being largely responsible for making Ireland an arable instead of a pasture country. In 1785 he became the last Speaker of the Irish House of Commons.

In 1768, Foster was elected for Navan and in 1783 for Sligo Borough. Both times he had also stood for Louth, which constituency he then chose to represent. He held this seat until the Act of Union in 1801, which he opposed. From 1785 to 1800 he was Speaker of the Irish Parliament.

It was said by his critics that his opposition to the Union was less political than personal: summoned to London for consultations, he found himself treated with contempt by the English officials he dealt with, who mocked his broad Irish accent and called him "Mister Spaker". On returning to Ireland he launched a campaign of opposition to the Union. He ultimately refused to surrender the Speaker's mace, which was kept by his family and is now on display in the Parliament House, Dublin (now the Bank of Ireland).

He served as Custos Rotulorum of Louth from 1798 to 1801 and Governor of Louth from 1798 to his death.

Foster was returned in 1801 to the new United Kingdom parliament as a member for County Louth, and from 1804 to 1806 was Irish Chancellor of the Exchequer under Pitt. 

From 1807 to 1813 he was second Commissioner in the Irish Treasury and from 1807 to 1812 one of the Lord Commissioners of the UK Treasury.

In 1821 he has created a peer of the United Kingdom as Baron Oriel, of Ferrard, in the County of Louth, and died on 23 August 1828.

Family

In 1764, he married Margaretta Amelia Burgh, daughter of Thomas Burgh, MP for Lanesborough, and his wife Anne Downes, daughter of Dive Downes, Bishop of Cork and Ross. John and Margaretta had two sons and a daughter.

His elder son, John Foster, was MP for Dunleer 1790–92 and died without issue before 18 April 1792. That John should not be confused with his cousin John William Foster, MP for Dunleer 1783–90.

His wife (d. 1824) had in 1790 been created an Irish peeress, as Baroness Oriel, and in 1797 Viscountess Ferrard. Their younger son, Thomas Henry (1772–1843), who married Harriet Skeffington, Viscountess Massereene in her own right, and took the name of Skeffington, inherited all these titles; the later Viscounts Massereene being their descendants.

John and Margaretta also had a daughter, Anne, who married James Blackwood, 2nd Baron Dufferin, but had no children. She outlived her husband by many years and reached the age of 93.

One of his first cousins married Elizabeth Hervey, aka Lady Bess Foster, aka Elizabeth, Duchess of Devonshire. His younger brother was Lord Bishop Foster.

Arms

References

External links

Foster papers Online at the Northern Ireland Public Records Office

Biography and letters

1740 births
1828 deaths
18th-century Anglo-Irish people
19th-century Anglo-Irish people
Barons in the Peerage of the United Kingdom
Peers of the United Kingdom created by George IV
Foster, John
Foster, John
Foster, John
Foster, John
Foster, John
Foster, John
Foster, John
Foster, John
Foster, John
Foster, John
Foster, John
Foster, John
Foster, John
Foster, John
Foster, John
Foster, John
UK MPs who were granted peerages
Fellows of the Royal Society
Members of the Privy Council of Ireland
Commissioners of the Treasury for Ireland
Members of the Parliament of Ireland (pre-1801) for County Meath constituencies
Members of the Parliament of Ireland (pre-1801) for County Louth constituencies
Members of the Parliament of Ireland (pre-1801) for County Sligo constituencies